Mount Abundance is a locality in the Maranoa Region, Queensland, Australia.

History 
The name comes from the name of the mountain, which in turned was named by Surveyor-General Thomas Mitchell on 7 May 1846 because of the "abundance of pasture" in the area.

On 17 May 1927, 57 allotments of Mount Abundance land, south-west of Roma, were advertised for lease by the Lands Department. Each lease carried a condition that a certain area had to be cultivated with wheat within a specified period. A map advertised the offer which ran from the 17 to 31 May 1927.

Road infrastructure
The Warrego Highway runs along the northern boundary.

References 

Maranoa Region
Localities in Queensland